Mateus Alves Maciel (born 2 May 1984 in Turmalina), known as just Mateus, is a Brazilian footballer who plays for Villa Nova as a central defender.

He represented a number of clubs, notably playing for Portuguesa in 2011.

Honours
Portuguesa
Campeonato Brasileiro Série B: 2011

References

External links

1984 births
Living people
Brazilian footballers
Association football defenders
Campeonato Brasileiro Série A players
Campeonato Brasileiro Série B players
Campeonato Brasileiro Série C players
Ipatinga Futebol Clube players
Atlético Clube Goianiense players
Associação Portuguesa de Desportos players
Cruzeiro Esporte Clube players
Sport Club do Recife players
Figueirense FC players
Boa Esporte Clube players
Clube Atlético Hermann Aichinger players
Guarani FC players
Villa Nova Atlético Clube players